Hasanabad (also Romanized as Ḩasanābād; also known as Gassan-Abad) is a village in Kalej Rural District, in the Central District of Nowshahr County, Mazandaran Province, Iran.

It is located on the Caspian Sea.

At the 2006 census, its population was 1,099, in 301 families.

References 

Populated places in Nowshahr County
Populated coastal places in Iran
Populated places on the Caspian Sea